Sparganothoides plemmelana is a species of moth of the family Tortricidae. It is found in Guatemala.

The length of the forewings is 8.6–9.6 mm. The ground colour of the forewings is light brownish yellow. The hindwings are grey.

Etymology
The species name refers to the discordance between superficial and genitalic similarities among this species and its most closely related congeners and is derived from Greek plemmeles (meaning discordant).

References

Moths described in 2009
Sparganothoides